Shu-Aib Walters (born 26 December 1981) is a South African association football player who last played as a goalkeeper for Ajax Cape Town in the Premier Soccer League.

Personal life
Walters, who is one of the few Muslim players in the PSL, hails from Mowbray.

References

1981 births
Living people
Sportspeople from Cape Town
Cape Coloureds
South African Muslims
South African soccer players
Association football goalkeepers
South Africa international soccer players
Vasco da Gama (South Africa) players
Bloemfontein Celtic F.C. players
Maritzburg United F.C. players
Mpumalanga Black Aces F.C. players
Cape Town City F.C. (2016) players
2010 FIFA World Cup players